Acromantis insularis, common name Luzon mantis, is a species of praying mantis found in India, Sumatra, and Java.

See also
List of mantis genera and species

References

Insularis
Mantodea of Asia
Mantodea of Southeast Asia
Insects of India
Insects of Indonesia
Fauna of Java
Fauna of Sumatra
Insects described in 1915